Ernest Renshaw defeated Donald Stewart 0–6, 6–3, 6–0, 6–2 in the All Comers' Final, but the reigning champion William Renshaw defeated Ernest Renshaw 2–6, 6–3, 6–3, 4–6, 6–3 in the challenge round to win the gentlemen's singles tennis title at the 1883 Wimbledon Championships. The challenge round was watched by 2500 spectators.

Draw

Challenge round

All comers' finals

Top half

Bottom half

References

External links

Singles
Wimbledon Championship by year – Men's singles